Kustaa Rafael Paasio, born Hellström (6 June 1903 – 17 March 1980) was a prominent Finnish politician and editor from Social Democratic Party. He served as Prime Minister of Finland twice.

Paasio was born in Uskela and was in contact with the Social Democratic Labor movement at an early age. Paasio was elected to the parliament in 1948. Before that he participated in Turku municipal politics and was since 1942 the chief of newspaper Turun Päivälehti. Paasio was the chairman of SDP from 1963 to 1975, and served as the prime minister twice, 1966-1968 and 1972, and was also twice the Speaker of the Parliament. Both his son, Pertti Paasio, and his granddaughter, Heli Paasio, have been members of the parliament.

Social Democrats remember Rafael Paasio, above all, as party unifier and strengthener. In addition, the party reached decent relations with Soviet Union during his term. 
Paasio positioned himself in the middle of left-wingers and right-wingers in the party. His support to Kekkonen allowed a new coming for SDP-led governments. His first cabinet began building the modern Finnish welfare state, and the second government laid the foundation for Finland's EEC agreement. Therefore, his actions had a revolutionary impact on Finnish history.

Paasio was the Social Democrat candidate in the 1962 presidential elections. He died in Turku, aged 76.

Cabinets
 Paasio I Cabinet
 Paasio II Cabinet

References

1903 births
1980 deaths
People from Salo, Finland
People from Turku and Pori Province (Grand Duchy of Finland)
Leaders of the Social Democratic Party of Finland
Prime Ministers of Finland
Speakers of the Parliament of Finland
Members of the Parliament of Finland (1948–51)
Members of the Parliament of Finland (1951–54)
Members of the Parliament of Finland (1954–58)
Members of the Parliament of Finland (1958–62)
Members of the Parliament of Finland (1962–66)
Members of the Parliament of Finland (1966–70)
Members of the Parliament of Finland (1970–72)
Members of the Parliament of Finland (1972–75)